Bodmer is a German surname. Notable people with the surname include:

Frederick Bodmer, Swiss philologist
Johann Georg Bodmer (1786–1864), inventor

Johann Jakob Bodmer (1698–1783), German-Swiss author and critic
Karl Bodmer (1809–1893), Swiss painter of the American West
Martin Bodmer, (1899-1971), Swiss purchaser of the Bodmer Papyri
Mathieu Bodmer (born 1982), French footballer
Paul Bodmer (1886–1983), Swiss painter.
Sir Walter Bodmer (born 1936), geneticist, winner of the 1994 Michael Faraday Prize

See also 
Bodmér, a village in Hungary

German-language surnames
Toponymic surnames